Catawba may refer to:

Catawba people, a Native American tribe in the Carolinas
Catawba language, a language in the Catawban languages family
Catawban languages

Botany
Catalpa, a genus of trees, based on the name used by the Catawba and other Native American tribes
Catawba (grape), a variety of grape
Catawba rhododendron (Rhododendron catawbiense), a flowering shrub plant

Places in the United States
Catawba, Missouri
Catawba, North Carolina
Catawba, Ohio
Catawba Island Township, Ottawa County, Ohio
Catawba Island State Park, part of Lake Erie Islands State Park, Ohio
Catawba, South Carolina
Catawba, Virginia
Catawba, West Virginia
Catawba, Wisconsin
Catawba (town), Wisconsin
Catawba County, North Carolina
Catawba Mountain, see Catawba, Virginia
Catawba River
Catawba Valley, see Catawba, Virginia

Other
USS Catawba, the name of an ironclad and several United States Navy tugs
Catawba College, Salisbury, North Carolina
Catawba Nuclear Station, near Rock Hill, South Carolina
Camp Catawba, a former boys' camp in the Blue Ridge Mountains of North Carolina
Catawba worm, the larval stage of the Ceratomia catalpae moth
Catawba Hospital, a mental health facility in Catawba, Virginia
Catawba, a fictional state in Thomas Wolfe's Look Homeward, Angel

Language and nationality disambiguation pages